Popular Unity (UP), officially registered as the Electoral Instrument for Popular Unity is a left-wing nationalist political party in Argentina, founded by trade union leader and former CTA secretary-general Víctor De Gennaro in 2010. It is part of the Frente de Todos, the coalition formed in 2019 to support the presidential candidacy of Alberto Fernández. From 2011 to 2013 it was part of the Broad Progressive Front (FAP).

The party presently counts with no representation at the federal level; UP's De Gennaro and Claudio Lozano both sat in the Argentine Chamber of Deputies until 2015. De Gennaro ran an unsuccessful presidential campaign at the 2015 general election.

History 
In 2010, the Electoral Instrument for Popular Unity (UP) party was established,  in the Province of Buenos Aires, with which De Gennaro was a member of the Broad Progressive Front that led to Hermes Binner as presidential candidate in 2011.

The national elections of that year gave the FAP the second place in the country, and Víctor De Gennaro the entry as national deputy for Buenos Aires. After his inauguration in the Congress of the Argentine Nation, De Gennaro along with Claudio Lozano, Graciela Iturraspe, Liliana Parada and Antonio Riestra make up the Popular Unity Bloc, which in turn was part of the Frente Amplio Progresista interblock. This agreement lasted until 2013, when some FAP parties promoted the entry of the UCR to the front, a situation that Unidad Popular did not accept and declared the Frente Amplio Progresista dissolved and the Frente Amplio UNEN was formed subsequently.

After this rupture, the party chaired by De Gennaro forms the Front, in alliance with the Labor and People Party (PTP) and the Socialist Workers Movement (MST), a front that in Buenos Aires nominated teacher Marta Maffei for national deputy.

Already in 2014, with his allies from the PTP, and with new parties such as Emancipación Sur and Camino de los Libres, Víctor de Gennaro formalized his candidacy for President of the Nation for the 2015 general elections, in the so-called Popular Front, but de Gennaro failed to pass the electoral threshold and was subsequently excluded from the first round.

Electoral performance

President

Chamber of Deputies

References

External links
Official website 

Political parties established in 2010
2010 establishments in Argentina
Left-wing parties in Argentina
Peronist parties and alliances in Argentina